Friedrich Krüger may refer to:
 Friedrich-Wilhelm Krüger, German war criminal and paramilitary commander
 Friedrich Krüger (diplomat), diplomat in the service of the city state of Lübeck